Adrián Andres Puentes Peréz (born 3 July 1988 in Sancti Spíritus), known as Adrián Puentes, is a Cuban male recurve archer and part of the national team. He competed at the 2007, 2011 and 2015 Pan American Games in the men's individual  and team event.

Notes

References

External links
 
 
 
 
 Adrián Puentes Peréz at the 2019 Pan American Games

1988 births
Living people
Cuban male archers
Place of birth missing (living people)
Archers at the 2015 Pan American Games
Archers at the 2011 Pan American Games
Archers at the 2007 Pan American Games
Archers at the 2019 Pan American Games
Archers at the 2016 Summer Olympics
Olympic archers of Cuba
Pan American Games medalists in archery
Pan American Games gold medalists for Cuba
Central American and Caribbean Games bronze medalists for Cuba
Central American and Caribbean Games silver medalists for Cuba
Competitors at the 2018 Central American and Caribbean Games
Central American and Caribbean Games medalists in archery
Medalists at the 2007 Pan American Games
People from Sancti Spíritus
21st-century Cuban people